Orbay is a surname. Notable people with the surname include:

Hasan Orbay (born 1979), Turkish archer
Kazım Orbay (1887–1964), Turkish general and senator
Rauf Orbay (1881–1964), Turkish naval officer and statesman

Turkish-language surnames